Independent Hezbollah deputies was a parliamentary group in the Iranian Parliament between 1996 and 2000. 

It was consisted of members of the parliament who did not join the conservative Hezbollah fraction, nor its opposition Hezbollah Assembly.

Most members of the fraction were unseated in the 2000 Iranian legislative election, as only ten managed to win the elections in their district.

References 

Iranian Parliament fractions
1996 establishments in Iran
2000 disestablishments in Iran
5th legislature of the Islamic Republic of Iran